

See also 
 United States House of Representatives elections, 1798
 List of United States representatives from Connecticut

Notes 

1798
Connecticut
United States House of Representatives